Diploglena capensis is a species of spiders in the family Caponiidae found in South Africa.

References

Spiders described in 1904
Caponiidae
Spiders of South Africa